Cabomina is a genus of moths in the family Sesiidae.

Species
Cabomina dracomontana  de Freina, 2008
Cabomina heliostoma (Meyrick, 1926)
Cabomina monicae  de Freina, 2008
Cabomina tsomoana de Freina, 2011

References

Sesiidae